Jonathan Jorge Suárez (born 8 May 1999) is a Uruguayan footballer who plays as a midfielder for Cerro Largo in the Uruguayan Primera División.

References

External links
Jonathan Jorge at playmakerstats.com (English version of ceroacero.es)

1999 births
Living people
Liverpool F.C. (Montevideo) players
Cerro Largo F.C. players
Uruguayan Primera División players
Uruguayan footballers
Association football midfielders
People from Artigas Department